Pöttmes is a market town and municipality in the district of Aichach-Friedberg in Bavaria in Germany.

Personalities

Sons and Daughters of the Community 
 Aurelie Deffner (1881-1959), politician
 Joachim Rückert (born 1945), legal scientist

Honorary citizen 
 Karl Hofmann (1924-2012), awarded in 1991, 1st Mayor 1972-1990

References

Aichach-Friedberg